Dhari Almutairi is a paralympic athlete from Kuwait competing mainly in category F32 shot put events.

Dhari competed in the F32 shot put in the 2004 Summer Paralympics and won a bronze medal.

References

Paralympic athletes of Kuwait
Athletes (track and field) at the 2004 Summer Paralympics
Paralympic bronze medalists for Kuwait
Living people
Medalists at the 2004 Summer Paralympics
Year of birth missing (living people)
Paralympic medalists in athletics (track and field)
Kuwaiti male shot putters